Dennis Edwards (19 January 1937 –  13 September 2019) was an English professional footballer who played as an inside forward in the Football League, most notably for Charlton Athletic, for whom he made over 170 appearances. He also played league football for Portsmouth, Brentford and Aldershot. Earlier in his career, Edwards was a prolific goalscorer in non-League football for Slough Town and Wycombe Wanderers and he was capped by England at amateur level.

Personal life 
Edwards was educated at the Lea School and Slough Grammar School. After leaving school he worked as a clerk for ICI and served his national service in the RAF. Edwards was a Brentford supporter. After retiring from football, he lived in Denmead and established a frozen food business.

Career statistics

Honours 
Slough Town

Berks & Bucks Senior Cup: 1954–55
Berks & Bucks Benevolent Cup (2): 1955–56, 1956–57

References

External links

1937 births
2019 deaths
English footballers
Sportspeople from Slough
Association football forwards
Charlton Athletic F.C. players
Portsmouth F.C. players
Brentford F.C. players
Aldershot F.C. players
English Football League players
England amateur international footballers
People educated at Upton Court Grammar School
Slough Town F.C. players
Wycombe Wanderers F.C. players
Isthmian League players
Footballers from Berkshire